My Own Peculiar Way is the ninth studio album by country singer Willie Nelson. It was his last release in the 1960s. Bergen White was the conductor and arranger. This became Willie's first studio album in which he used his new classical acoustic guitar called Martin N-20 that he named "Trigger".

Recording and composition
Nelson recorded the title track on his debut album for Liberty seven years earlier.  The song had also been covered by Perry Como.  The album contains several Nelson originals, as well as a song written with Nelson's songwriting friend Hank Cochran, “Any Old Arms Won’t Do.”  Perhaps the most significant musical development on My Own Peculiar Way was Nelson discovering the Martin N-20 classical guitar that would become famously known as "Trigger."  In his autobiography the singer recalls:

I switched over to a big Baldwin hooked up to an aluminum amp.  When the neck broke, I traded it in for a Martin made of rosewood, an acoustic model with the richest, most soulful tone I’d ever heard.  I had my man Shot Jackson, a guitar genius in Nashville, customize the Martin by integrating the guts and pickup from the Baldwin.  It worked.  I had the sound I was looking for.  I heard it as a human sound, a sound close to my own voice.  Didn’t take long for me to pick a hole in it.  That’s ‘cause classical guitars aren’t meant to be picked.  But that hole...seemed to deepen its soulful tone.

The Martin guitar changed his sound but, as Nelson biographer Joe Nick Patoski asserts, “you couldn’t tell by the records he was making.  Vibes, trumpets, violins, a cello, saxophones, and a trombone embellished My Own Peculiar Way.”  Nelson actually scored a surprise hit previously with the upbeat “Bring Me Sunshine,” a song written by Sylvia Dee and Arthur Kent.  Featuring an impressive imitation of a Vegas lounge singer, Nelson took the song to number 13 on the country singles chart, his best showing yet for RCA.  However, the first single from his new album, “Natural to Be Gone,” bombed, not even charting, and the LP barely made the Top 40, peaking at number 39.  By this time even Atkins was stumped, later confessing, "With a record company you can have a whole room full of people who all put their heads together and grind away at a problem and still come up with the wrong answer."

Reception
AllMusic: “When Nelson gets into a song, he has a way of playing with the sounds and rhythm of words to get everything possible from a song. Nearly every song on this record is like that, whether it's one he penned or a cover like John Hartford's ‘Natural to Be Gone.’”

Track listing
All tracks composed by Willie Nelson, except where noted.

"My Own Peculiar Way"
"I Walk Alone" (Herbert Wilson)
"Any Old Arms Won't Do" (Hank Cochran, Nelson)
"I Just Don't Understand"
"I Just Dropped By"
"Local Memory"
"That's All"
"I Let My Mind Wander"
"Natural to Be Gone" (John Hartford)
"Love Has a Mind of Its Own" (Dallas Frazier)
"Message"
"It Will Come to Pass" (Don Baird)

Personnel
Willie Nelson – vocals, guitar
Grady Martin – guitar
Jerry Reed – guitar
Wayne Moss – guitar
Charlie McCoy – guitar, piano, vibes
Bob Moore – bass
David Briggs – piano
Buddy Harman – drums
Jerry Carrigan – drums

References

Bibliography

1969 albums
Willie Nelson albums
Albums produced by Chet Atkins
RCA Records albums